Zhang Yi (born 17 February 1978 in Harbin) is a Chinese actor best known for his roles in films Dearest, Cock and Bull and Operation Red Sea and television series Soldiers Sortie, My Chief and My Regiment and Feather Flies to the Sky.

Biography
Zhang has always wanted to become a television announcer, yet was unsuccessful in his attempts to attend the Beijing Broadcasting Institute for various reasons. Zhang Yi developed an interest in stage acting after attending the Harbin Theatre Academy, and was later accepted by the Beijing Comrade-in-Arm Modern Drama Troupe at the age of 20.

Career
Zhang made his drama debut and received widespread recognition as Comrade Shi Jin in the critically and commercially successful 2006 drama Soldiers Sortie, and continued to collaborate with writer Lan Xiaolong in upcoming military war dramas My Chief and My Regiment and The Line, which were both critical hits, scoring 8.9 and 9.2 on Douban respectively.

Zhang was widely praised for his acting as a father desperate to find his abducted son in 2014 feature film Dearest, and received his first major acting award at the 30th Golden Rooster Awards. In 2016, he played a secret police who was willing to fight for a better world in wuxia film Brotherhood of Blades II, and also starred in Cao Baoping's black comedy Cock and Bull, which garnered him another Best Supporting Actor nomination at the 31st Golden Rooster Awards.

In 2016, Zhang played the protagonist in entrepreneurial drama Feather Flies to the Sky, and received Best Actor awards at the 23rd Magnolia Awards and 29th Golden Eagle Awards. He then starred in action war film Operation Red Sea, which became the second-highest-grossing-film ever in China.

Filmography

Film

Television series

Awards and nominations

References

External links
 

 

1978 births
Male actors from Harbin
Living people
Chinese male stage actors
21st-century Chinese male actors
Chinese male film actors
Chinese male television actors